Nicolás Kosturakis Yanarakis (April 4, 1912 – November 17, 1986) son of Antonios Kostourakis Troullinos and Eleny Giannarakis Kanou, was born in the village of Kalyves, in the municipality of Apokoronas, on the island of Crete, Greece.

He was a notable Greek businessman and philanthropist who emigrated to Mexico in 1930. As a person of great political and social influence in both Greece and Mexico, he was also known for his notorious charitable support, and was awarded the diplomatic title of Honorary Consul of Greece in the Mexican city of Chihuahua. He was a Freemason of the Grand Lodge of the State of Chihuahua, "Cosmos".

Along with his wife for more than 30 years, María Lucila García Stevens, he fathered three sons and two daughters: Nicolás Kosturakis García, Demetrio Kosturakis Garcia, Jorge Kosturakis García, María Lucila Kosturakis García, and Eleny Kosturakis García.

1912 births
1986 deaths
20th-century Greek businesspeople
20th-century Mexican businesspeople
Greek emigrants to Mexico
People from Chihuahua (state)

References